Howar is both a surname and a given name. Notable people with the name include:

Tim Howar (born 1969), Canadian actor, singer and dancer
Howar Ziad, Iraqi diplomat

See also
Howard